Ed Kaminski (born March 26, 1968, in Kansas City, Kansas) is a retired American track and field athlete who specialized in the javelin throw. He represented his country at three consecutive World Championships although without qualifying for the final on any occasion. In addition he won the silver medal at the 1993 Summer Universiade.

His personal best in the event is 82.44 meters (270 ft 6 in) set in Emporia in 1994.

Competition record

References

External links
USATF profile

1968 births
Living people
Sportspeople from Kansas City, Kansas
American male javelin throwers
World Athletics Championships athletes for the United States
Athletes (track and field) at the 1995 Pan American Games
Arkansas Razorbacks men's track and field athletes
Universiade medalists in athletics (track and field)
Universiade silver medalists for the United States
Medalists at the 1993 Summer Universiade
Competitors at the 1998 Goodwill Games
Pan American Games track and field athletes for the United States